The Crazy World of Arthur Brown is the debut studio album by the English rock band the Crazy World of Arthur Brown. Released in the United Kingdom in June 1968 by Track Records and in the United States in September 1968 through Atlantic, the album was an international success, propelled by the transatlantic hit single "Fire". It was the only album released during the Crazy World's original incarnation. 

A psychedelic soul album, its style is defined by frontman Arthur Brown's wide-ranging theatrical vocals and mystical lyrics, with the first side of the original LP comprising a conceptual song cycle known as "the Fire Suite". The album's sound and Brown's stage act influenced subsequent musicians such as David Bowie, Peter Gabriel, Alice Cooper, Marilyn Manson and George Clinton.

Recording
The Crazy World of Arthur Brown had recorded a single called "Devil's Grip", which had failed to chart. However, Atlantic Records was interested in recording an album of the band's music, and the band went to work on The Fire Suite, a concept album built around their song "Fire", which was popular in their live act. The album was produced by the Who's manager Kit Lambert for his own label, Track Records, with associate production by Pete Townshend. The band line-up consisted of Arthur Brown (vocals), Vincent Crane (organ, piano and vibes), and Drachen Theaker (drums). Bass guitar, where used, was provided by Nick Greenwood; session drummer John Marshall replaced Theaker on two selections. The album was recorded on four-track reels with instrumentation consisting of bass, drums, keyboard, and Brown's vocals. The drumming was recorded on the same tape as the keyboards. On Ronnie Wood's radio show on November 14, 2011, both Wood and Alice Cooper claim that Wood played bass guitar on the single "Fire", but Polly Marshall's biography of Arthur Brown states that "[Wood] must have confused it with the BBC session [on April 8, 1968]." There is no bass guitar on "Fire", only bass pedals.

After recording the album, the Crazy World of Arthur Brown embarked on their first American tour, supporting the Doors, Frank Zappa and MC5. After Lambert delivered the album to Atlantic, the label told Lambert that they enjoyed the album but thought that Theaker couldn't keep time in his drumming, and wanted the drum track re-recorded, an impossibility with the drums and keyboards having been recorded on the same reel. Lambert suggested to Brown that horns and strings be overdubbed to mask the perceived deficiencies. Brown agreed, and Crane wrote the brass arrangements. The overdub sessions took two weeks to record. Brown later said that they were mixing the album for "probably fourteen hours a day". After the remix was done, Lambert's business partner, Chris Stamp, played the acetate for the band during one stop that occurred on their American tour. Brown alleged that approximately four minutes into the acetate, Theaker "leapt across the room, took it off the turntable, smashed it on the wall", claiming that his drumming had been "buried" in the mix. Brown defended the overdubs, saying that they added to the album's overall presentation, replacing visuals and costume changes he would have employed in live performance to achieve dramatic effect.

Composition
The Crazy World of Arthur Brown has a psychedelic soul sound that encompasses British rhythm and blues, psychedelia and pop. Mike Knoop, writing for Classic Rock magazine, said that Brown's singing style recalls "Eric Burdon, Bob Calvert, Ian Gillan, Tim Curry, Brian Connolly, and a smidgen of King Diamond all coming out of one person." Brian Carr, another Classic Rock writer, compared the album's music to that of Alice Cooper and Frank Zappa. Gary Claydon, also for Classic Rock, opined that the album's music was not rock and roll, due to the presence of organ playing instead of guitars.

The album was originally conceived by Brown as The Fire Suite, a rock opera which would have focused on the horrors of Hell. Lambert dissauded him against the uncommercial original concept. As a compromise, side A of the vinyl record featured a suite of songs written as part of the album's original concept, while side B featured unrelated songs, including covers of Screamin' Jay Hawkins' "I Put a Spell on You" and James Brown's "I've Got Money", which had been a part of the band's stage act. The two covers have been called "fine examples of British R&B". The original song "Rest Cure" has been described as "basic pop", while "Spontaneous Apple Creation" was described as the album's most psychedelic recording, due to its high amount of sound effects. "Fire" has been cited as an example of psychedelic rock.

Release and reception

The album was released in June 1968 on Track in the UK, and by Atlantic in the United States that September. The album peaked at No. 7 on Billboard's Pop Albums chart, No. 2 on the UK charts, and No. 6 in Canada. The album's first single, "Fire," was a global success, reaching No. 1 in the UK in August 1968, No. 2 on the Billboard Hot 100 in the US in October 1968, No. 1 in Canada also in October, and No. 19 in Australia again in October. "Fire" sold over one million copies, and was awarded a gold disc. It was sampled by the band Marilyn Manson, who were influenced by Arthur Brown, on their 1995 single "Lunchbox". Other artists influenced by the album's sound and Brown's stage performance included David Bowie, Peter Gabriel, Alice Cooper and George Clinton. Due to the album's international success, the Crazy World of Arthur Brown received a  £650,000 advance to record a follow-up album. However, the band subsequently broke up after the recording, and their second album, Strangelands, was not released until 1988, almost 20 years after it had been recorded.

Richie Unterberger, writing for AllMusic, called the album "an exhilaratingly reckless slice of psychedelia" in a retrospective review. Of the less favorable retrospective reviews, the staff of Classic Rock gave the album a score of 5.65 out of 10 (rounded to 2.5/5), based on 99 votes from staff writers, and The Rolling Stone Album Guide gave the album 1 star, deeming it to be "English eccentricity at its most daft."

Track listing 

Finesilver and Ker are not credited as authors of "Fire" on original pressings of the album or attending single.

"Child of My Kingdom" is 7:03 on the compact disc reissues.

"Time" and "Confusion" are indexed as two tracks on the 50th anniversary edition.

Personnel
 Arthur Brown – vocals
 Vincent Crane – Hammond organ, piano, vibes, musical arrangements and orchestration
 Nick Greenwood (billed as "Sean Nicholas") – bass guitar
 Drachen Theaker – drums
 John Marshall – drums (on "I Put a Spell on You" and "Child of My Kingdom")

Additional personnel
 Pete Townshend – associate producer
 Kit Lambert – producer
 David King – cover design
 David Montgomery – photography
 Ed Strait – compilation producer

References
Citations

Sources

 
 Marshall, Polly. The God of Hellfire, the Crazy Life and Times of Arthur Brown. SAF Publishing, 2005. .

Arthur Brown (musician) albums
1968 debut albums
Albums produced by Kit Lambert
Atlantic Records albums
Psychedelic soul albums
Track Records albums